Thomas William Heinsohn (August 26, 1934 – November 9, 2020) was an American professional basketball player. He was associated with the Boston Celtics of the National Basketball Association (NBA) for six decades as a player, coach and broadcaster. He played for the Celtics from 1956 to 1965, and also coached the team from 1969 to 1978. He spent over 30 years as the color commentator for the Celtics' local broadcasts alongside play-by-play commentator Mike Gorman. He is regarded as one of the most iconic Celtics figures in the franchise's history, known during his lifetime for his charisma and loyalty to the team and its traditions. From this, he earned the nickname "Mr. Celtic".

Heinsohn was inducted into the Naismith Memorial Basketball Hall of Fame for his contributions as a player. He was also inducted into the Hall of Fame for his success as a head coach. He also helped form the NBA Players Association. Heinsohn was the only person to have the distinction of being involved in an official team capacity in each of the Celtics' 17 championships, as well as each of their first 21 NBA Finals appearances.

Biography

College career
Born in Jersey City, New Jersey, Heinsohn was a standout at St. Michael's High School in nearby Union City. He accepted a scholarship to Holy Cross in Worcester, Massachusetts and became the school's all-time leading scorer with 1,789 points, an average of 22.1 points per game. During his senior year, Heinsohn scored a school-record 51 points in a game against Boston College, and averaged 27.4 points per game and 21.1 rebounds per game for the season.

Professional career

In 1956, Heinsohn was chosen as the Boston Celtics 'regional', or 'territorial', draft pick. In his first season, Heinsohn played in the NBA All-Star Game and was named the NBA Rookie of the Year over teammate Bill Russell.  He finished his rookie season by winning his first championship ring, scoring 37 points and grabbing 23 rebounds in the double-overtime 7th game of the NBA Finals.

Heinsohn was part of a Celtics squad that won eight NBA titles in nine years, including seven in a row between 1959 and 1965. In NBA history, only teammates Russell and Sam Jones won more championship rings during their playing careers, and Heinsohn's streak of going to the NBA Finals each season of his nine-year career is unmatched. Heinsohn retired after nine seasons due to a foot injury.

During his playing career, Heinsohn was named to six All-Star teams. On the day his teammate and fellow Holy Cross Crusader Bob Cousy retired, Heinsohn scored his 10,000th career point. His number 15 was retired by the Celtics in 1965.

Off the court, Heinsohn played an important leadership role in the NBA Players Association. He was the association's second president (following founding president Bob Cousy), and was instrumental in the league's acceptance of a pension plan for players following a showdown at the All-Star game in 1964, in which the All-Star players, led by Heinsohn, threatened to strike.

Coaching career

Heinsohn became the Celtics' head coach beginning in the 1969–70 season. He led the team to a league-best 68–14 record during the 1972–73 season and was named Coach of the Year, although Boston was upset in the playoffs. The next season Heinsohn and the Celtics won the championship, and they claimed another title in 1976. He accumulated a career coaching record of 427–263.

On February 14, 2015, it was announced that Heinsohn would be inducted into the Basketball Hall of Fame for a second time as a coaching inductee. He is one of five members of the class of 2015 who were directly elected and is just one of four people to be inducted as both a player and coach.

Broadcasting career
Heinsohn's broadcasting career began in 1966, calling play-by-play for WKBG's Celtics broadcasts, after being asked by Red Auerbach. He spent three seasons in this role before becoming coach in 1969. From 1990 to 1999, Heinsohn was the Celtics' road play-by-play man on WFXT, WSBK and WABU. In 1981, Heinsohn joined Mike Gorman as color commentator in the Celtics' television broadcasts; they became one of the longest-tenured tandems in sports broadcasting history. Occasionally, Bob Cousy made appearances with the tandem of Heinsohn and Gorman. On Celtics broadcasts, Heinsohn liked to point out players who displayed extra hustle to help the team by giving them "Tommy Points." One player in each game had exceptional play and hustle highlighted for the "Tommy Award". During broadcasts he was known for his sense of humor and indignantly questioning game officials when he felt calls against the Celtics were made in error.

For a time in the 1980s, Heinsohn was in the same capacity during CBS's playoff coverage of the NBA (with Dick Stockton), calling four Finals from 1984 to 1987, three of which involved the Boston Celtics against the Los Angeles Lakers. Heinsohn also teamed with Brent Musburger, Verne Lundquist, and James Brown during his time with CBS. Heinsohn also called NCAA college basketball during the Men's Tournaments starting with the 1986–87 season, later devoting more time to calling college games for CBS than the pros, being used for regular season as well as tournament games until the 1990 NCAA men's basketball tournament. For NCAA games, Heinsohn was typically paired with Verne Lundquist. After the 1987 NBA season, Heinsohn was moved from the primary color analyst role to 2nd on the network's depth chart, being paired with Brent Musburger for the 1987–88 season, calling solely playoff games. Heinsohn in the 1988–89 season again only called playoff games, paired with Verne Lundquist. In his final season, Heinsohn called a regular-season game for CBS as well as early-round 1990 NBA playoff games with James Brown.

Personal life and later career
Heinsohn was married to Diane Regenhard. Their marriage ended in divorce.  Tom and Diane Heinsohn had three children: Paul, David, and Donna. He had 5 grandchildren: Danielle, Victoria, Brooke, Adrian, and Christopher. Heinsohn's second wife was Helen Weiss, who died in 2008. 

Away from the court, Heinsohn enjoyed painting and playing golf; he once headed a life insurance company. In 1988, he wrote a memoir titled "Give 'em the Hook", with writer Joe Fitzgerald.

Death
Heinsohn died at his home from kidney failure on November 9, 2020, at the age of 86.

Awards and honors

10-time NBA Champion (eight as a player, two as a head coach)
1957 Rookie of the Year
Six-time NBA All-Star
1973 Coach of the Year
Two-time Naismith Memorial Basketball Hall of Fame inductee (as a player in 1986, and as a coach in 2015) 
Recipient of the 1995 Jack McMahon Award by the National Basketball Coaches Association
Recipient of the 2009 Chuck Daly Lifetime Achievement Award by the NBA Coaches Association
Number 15 retired by the Boston Celtics.
Number 24 retired by Holy Cross

NBA career statistics

Regular season

Playoffs

Coaching record

|-
| style="text-align:left;"|Boston
| style="text-align:left;"|
|82||34||48|||| style="text-align:center;"|6th in Eastern||||||||
| style="text-align:center;"|Missed playoffs
|-
| style="text-align:left;"|Boston
| style="text-align:left;"|
|82||44||38|||| style="text-align:center;"|3rd in Eastern||||||||
| style="text-align:center;"|Missed playoffs
|-
| style="text-align:left;"|Boston
| style="text-align:left;"|
|82||56||26|||| style="text-align:center;"|4th in Eastern||11||5||6||
| style="text-align:center;"|Lost in Conference Finals
|-
| style="text-align:left;"|Boston
| style="text-align:left;"|
|82||68||14|||| style="text-align:center;"|1st in Atlantic||13||7||6||
| style="text-align:center;"|Lost in Conference Finals
|- ! style="background:#FDE910;"
| style="text-align:left;"|Boston
| style="text-align:left;"|
|82||56||26|||| style="text-align:center;"|1st in Atlantic||18||12||6||
| style="text-align:center;"|Won NBA Championship
|-
| style="text-align:left;"|Boston
| style="text-align:left;"|
|82||60||22|||| style="text-align:center;"|1st in Atlantic||11||6||5||
| style="text-align:center;"|Lost in Conference Finals
|- ! style="background:#FDE910;"
| style="text-align:left;"|Boston
| style="text-align:left;"|
|82||54||28|||| style="text-align:center;"|1st in Atlantic||18||12||6||
| style="text-align:center;"|Won NBA Championship
|-
| style="text-align:left;"|Boston
| style="text-align:left;"|
|82||44||38|||| style="text-align:center;"|2nd in Atlantic||9||5||4||
| style="text-align:center;"|Lost in Conference Semifinals
|-
| style="text-align:left;"|Boston
| style="text-align:left;"|
|34||11||23|||| style="text-align:center;"|3rd in Atlantic||||||||
| style="text-align:center;"|(released)
|- class="sortbottom"
| style="text-align:left;" colspan="2"|Career
|690||427||263|||| ||80||47||33||

See also
 List of NCAA Division I men's basketball players with 30 or more rebounds in a game
 List of NBA players with most championships

References

External links

 
 

1934 births
2020 deaths
American people of German descent
All-American college men's basketball players
American color commentators
American men's basketball coaches
American men's basketball players
American television sports announcers
Basketball coaches from New Jersey
Basketball players from Jersey City, New Jersey
Boston Celtics announcers
Boston Celtics draft picks
Boston Celtics head coaches
Boston Celtics players
Boston sportscasters
Holy Cross Crusaders men's basketball players
Naismith Memorial Basketball Hall of Fame inductees
National Basketball Association All-Stars
National Basketball Association championship-winning head coaches
National Basketball Association players with retired numbers
National Basketball Players Association presidents
National Collegiate Basketball Hall of Fame inductees
Power forwards (basketball)
Sportspeople from Jersey City, New Jersey